Crocknalaragagh is a mountain in County Donegal, Ireland with a height of 471 m.

Geography 
It is the second most northern and lowest of the mountain chain, locally called the Seven Sisters that also includes Muckish, Aghla Beg, Ardloughnabrackbaddy, Aghla More, Mackoght (also known as 'little Errigal') and Errigal. All of the Seven Sisters are part of the Derryveagh Mountain range.

References

Marilyns of Ireland
Mountains and hills of County Donegal